Sibapipunga beckeri is a species of beetle in the family Cerambycidae, and the only species in the genus Sibapipunga. It was described by Martins and Galileo in 1992.

References

Hemilophini
Beetles described in 1992